Adjumani Airport  is an airport that serves the town of Adjumani in the Northern Region of  Uganda, close to the international border with South Sudan.

The runway length does not include a  overrun on the western end.

See also
Transport in Uganda
List of airports in Uganda

References

External links
Uganda Civil Aviation Authority Homepage
OurAirports - Adjumani
OpenStreetMap - Adjumani Airstrip

Airports in Uganda
Adjumani District
West Nile sub-region
Northern Region, Uganda